Sigrid Stray (née Kluge; 29 May 1893 – 3 July 1978) was a Norwegian barrister and proponent for women's rights.

Personal life
She was born in Sandnes as a daughter of merchant Reier Kluge (1859–1921) and Anna Gausel (1863–1939). In March 1921 she married lawyer and politician Christian Stray, settling in Arendal. They were parents of Signe and Anne Lise Stray and in-laws of Rolv Ryssdal.

Career
Stray became Norway's second female barrister (after Elise Sem), and was a partner in a law firm with her husband. She also chaired the Norwegian National Women's Council from 1938, was ousted by the Nazi authorities in 1941 following the protest of the 43 and also imprisoned in Arkivet in 1944, but returned as chair from 1945 to 1946.

After a period as acting presiding judge in 1945–46, she conducted the defense for her pre-war client Knut Hamsun during the legal purge after World War II. She served as the first female chancellor of the Order of St. Olav, from 1956 to 1967.

See also 

 List of Arkivet prisoners

References

Norwegian women's rights activists
20th-century Norwegian judges
1893 births
1978 deaths
Norwegian feminists
Norwegian resistance members
Nazi concentration camp survivors
Personnel of the legal purge in Norway
Norwegian women judges
People from Sandnes
People from Arendal
20th-century Norwegian politicians
20th-century Norwegian women politicians
Stray family
20th-century women lawyers
20th-century women judges